A technology demonstration (or tech demo), also known as demonstrator model, is a prototype, rough example or an otherwise incomplete version of a conceivable product or future system, put together as proof of concept with the primary purpose of showcasing the possible applications, feasibility, performance and method of an idea for a new technology. They can be used as demonstrations to the investors, partners, journalists or even to potential customers in order to convince them of the viability of the chosen approach, or to test them on ordinary users.

Computers and gaming
Technology demonstrations are often used in the computer industry, emerging as an important tool in response to short development cycles, in both software and hardware development.

 Computer game developers use tech demos to rouse and maintain interest to titles still in development (because game engines are usually ready before the art is finished) and to ensure functionality by early testing. Short segments using finished game engines may be presented as game demos.
 Graphics cards manufacturers use tech demos to showcase the performance of their cards even before there are any games that can deliver that performance or before the product is ready to be used outside of the development labs. In November 2002, Nvidia started the practice of featuring realistic characters in graphics card technology demos, by releasing Dawn for its GeForce FX card. The demo featured a forest fairy with semi-realistic short hair and beautiful wings. Later Nvidia followed with similar, new demos and ATI Technologies joined the race.
 Being by nature much less complex than complete games (that have to include dynamic physics modelling, audio engines, etc.), technology demos for graphics can deliver substantially better image quality, making the general look of games lag several years behind video card technology demos. For example, the PlayStation 2 demos Namco Girl (a lifelike female character from Ridge Racer winking flirtatiously at viewers) and old man used all the processing power to produce a high-quality single character model, in a static environment. Xbox trailers also showed Raven, a buff woman and her robot, showing off martial art moves.

Computer technology demos should not be confused with demoscene-based demos, which, although often demonstrating new software techniques, are regarded as a stand-alone form of computer art.

Google Tech Demo
Demo Slam, a website from Google Inc., as launched with the slogan "Bring your creativity. Bring your tech. Just bring it in general, fool! Demo Slam is here!", was a large collection of technology demonstrations uploaded by users, and some of the Google executives as well, which will go to the 'Contender'.

Sales engineering technology demonstration
Sales Engineering staff, often bearing the title Sales Engineer or Presales Consultant, will prepare technology demonstrations for business meetings or seminars to show capabilities of business products. This can include both software and hardware products, and can show multiple products integrating together.  Usually a demonstration is less than a Proof of concept, but can come some of the way to showing how a business project may be justified. Large companies with tens or hundreds of Sales Engineers will often have a team who specialize in the production of demonstration systems and plans.

See also 

 Demo mode
 Game demo
 Research and development

References

External links
 The mother of all demos - Douglas Engelbart's demonstration 
 ''5 easy steps How to do a Great Tech Demo - How to do a Great Tech Demo!

Prototypes
 
Tests